Gabriel "Gabby" Chaves (born 7 July 1993) is a Colombian-American racing driver, currently competing in the WeatherTech SportsCar Championship and the Michelin Pilot Challenge. He raced in the IndyCar Series and is the 2014 Indy Lights Champion.

Racing career

Early career
After winning several karting titles, Chaves began racing cars in 2007 in Skip Barber series in the United States. In 2008 he made his pro debut in Formula BMW Americas and finished 4th in Formula BMW Pacific and finished 14th in the Formula BMW World Finals. In 2009 he competed in a full season of Formula BMW Americas for Eurointernational and won the title, capturing 5 wins and 3 poles.

Chaves brought his career to Europe in 2010, where he raced in the Italian Formula Three Championship with Eurointernational. He finished 10th in points and captured rookie of the year honors. In 2011 he signed to race with the Addax Team in the GP3 Series. Chaves finished 19th in points with a best finish of fourth at the Valencia Street Circuit.

American open-wheel racing
In 2012, Chaves return to the United States and signed with JDC MotorSports to race in the Star Mazda Championship. Chaves finished second in points with wins at the final two races of the season at Mazda Raceway Laguna Seca and Road Atlanta. The driver climbed to the Indy Lights in 2013, having signed for Schmidt Peterson Motorsports. He was runner-up with one win and ten podiums, and was part of the closest finish in the history of the Indianapolis Motor Speedway (when Peter Dempsey grabbed the Freedom 100 victory as part of a four-wide photo finish. Dempsey finished ahead of Chaves by a mere 0.0026 seconds).

He signed on with Belardi Auto Racing for the 2014 Indy Lights season and won the championship, capturing four wins (including the Freedom 100) and 11 podiums in 14 races.

Chaves signed with Bryan Herta Autosport to race full-time at the IndyCar Series in 2015. Chaves led 31 laps at Pocono Raceway and had assumed the lead after leader and fellow rookie Sage Karam crashed, fatally injuring Justin Wilson in the process. Chaves led when the race was restarted with six laps to go but was passed for the lead. He was still on pace for his first podium finish when his engine let go with three laps remaining, bringing out a caution flag and effectively ending the race. The race was both Chaves' first laps led and only DNF of the season. Chaves captured the Rookie of the Year title by 78 points over Stefano Coletti. However, due to a sponsor default, the team was unable to retain him for the next season. The team would confirm former Caterham and Manor Racing driver Alexander Rossi to drive the No. 98 for the season.

The Colombian drove part-time for Dale Coyne Racing in the 2016 season, with a best result of 12th at Detroit race 1. In 2017, Chaves joined Harding Racing for the Indianapolis 500, Texas and Pocono races.

Chaves was appointed as driver coach for the USF Juniors, an entry-level series for the Road to Indy, ahead of the inaugural season in 2022.

Sports car racing
Chaves joined the DeltaWing entry at the four endurance races of the United SportsCar Championship in 2014. He led 15 laps of the 10-hour finale at Road Atlanta, the Petit Le Mans, helping the team to a season-high fourth-place finish.

In 2020, Chaves joined Bryan Herta Autosport for a full season drive in the Michelin Pilot Challenge as a co-driver with Ryan Norman.

Personal life
Chaves' father is a Colombian JetBlue airline pilot and Chaves has raced under both the American and Colombian flags.

Racing record

Complete GP3 Series results
(key) (Races in bold indicate pole position) (Races in italics indicate fastest lap)

Star Mazda Championship

Indy Lights

IndyCar Series
(key)

 Season still in progress.

Indianapolis 500

IMSA SportsCar Championship
(key) (Races in bold indicate pole position)

† Points only counted towards the Michelin Endurance Cup, and not the overall LMP3 Championship.
* Season still in progress.

24 Hours of Daytona

References

External links
 
 
 
 

1993 births
Living people
Sportspeople from Bogotá
Colombian racing drivers
Formula BMW USA drivers
Formula BMW Pacific drivers
Italian Formula Three Championship drivers
Colombian GP3 Series drivers
FIA Institute Young Driver Excellence Academy drivers
Indy Pro 2000 Championship drivers
24 Hours of Daytona drivers
WeatherTech SportsCar Championship drivers
IndyCar Series drivers
Indy Lights champions
Indy Lights drivers
Colombian IndyCar Series drivers
Indianapolis 500 drivers
Indianapolis 500 Rookies of the Year
Harding Steinbrenner Racing drivers
JDC Motorsports drivers
Arrow McLaren SP drivers
Belardi Auto Racing drivers
Bryan Herta Autosport drivers
Dale Coyne Racing drivers
Andretti Autosport drivers
Action Express Racing drivers
EuroInternational drivers
Michelin Pilot Challenge drivers